Tropidophis morenoi, also commonly known as the zebra dwarf boa and the zebra trope, is a species of snake in the family Tropidophiidae. The species is endemic to the West Indies.

Etymology
The specific name, morenoi, is in honor of Cuban herpetologist Luis V. Moreno.

Geographic range
T. morenoi is endemic to Villa Clara Province, north-central Cuba.

Habitat

Description
T. morenoi is distinguished from other Tropidophis species by its buff ground color, with  brown spots fused to form zebra-like bands.

Reproduction
T. morenoi is viviparous.

References

Tropidophiidae
Endemic fauna of Cuba
Reptiles of the Caribbean
Reptiles described in 2001